Rhonda Vetere is an author, technology industry expert, keynote speaker, and panelist. She was formerly Executive Vice President, Chief Information Officer, and on the Executive Board of Herbalife Nutrition.

She was formerly the First President of Data and Analytics at nThrive and Chief Technology Officer at Estée Lauder Companies. Vetere has also held executive positions at Santander Bank, Pamplona Capital Management, AIG, HP Enterprise Services, Barclays, Bank One / JPMorgan Chase, and several telecommunications companies.

Biography 
Vetere was born in Fairfax, Virginia and grew up in the Washington, D.C. area. She studied Business, Communications, and Spanish at George Mason University, graduating in 1992 with a Bachelor of Arts degree.

Vetere worked for twelve years in various positions through mergers at CompuServe, UUNET, AOL, Worldcom, and MCI Inc. She became the managing director of the Global Infrastructure Operations Center at Bank One Corporation, later JPMorgan Chase, from 2002 to 2007, which included a 2-year assignment in Mumbai, India and extensive travel to Hong Kong and Asia during the JPMorgan Chase and Bank One merger in 2004.

From 2007 to 2010, Vetere was the managing director of technology & operations at Barclays, working two years in their London office. Vetere worked two years at Hewlett Packard Enterprise Services as their SVP of global enterprise services technology & operations until 2012. Starting in 2012, Vetere became SVP for global technology & infrastructure at AIG.

From December 2013 to January 2018, Vetere was the Chief Technology Officer at Estée Lauder Companies. In January 2018, Vetere joined nThrive's Executive Team as President of data and analytics.

Vetere currently serves on the World BPO / ITO Forum Board Executive Advisory Council, the corporate advisory board for Longwood University, and the board of directors for the School of Business at George Mason University.

Philanthropy 

Rhonda is soundly focused on the next generation of leaders, veterans and the conversation of Africa as well as helping others and transforming lives. It’s her belief that girls are limited by a lack of female role models which is why Rhonda is committed to S.T.E.A.M. and specifically with women empowered organizations. She’s involved in global programs like Girls Leadership Academy Meetup that equip girls with the skills and confidence to seek leadership roles, feel the power within their voice, and create positive change. For three years running, Vetere has participated in the Serengeti Girls Run for Female Empowerment in Tanzania which is a fundraiser and wellness initiative with all of the proceeds going to girl empowerment groups and the conservation for the safari that is hosted by the Grumeti Fund and Singita. The event includes a 55-mile run through the plains of Africa joined by many of the women that she is there to support.

Additionally, she is an Africa Community & Conservation Foundation global ambassador. She’s been added to the Boys and Girls Club Board of Trustees and oversees their technology Committee. She mentors a former Seal Team 6 member and a Board Member of VETTOCEO as well as supports numerous community events/programs that benefit all of these groups of individuals.

Rhonda participated in the 2021 Navy SEAL Swim in the Hudson River with the GI Go Fund — alongside 150 active & veteran Navy SEALs. Rhonda was the second female to complete the full swim, and she was one of the first in the water.

The event honors “our military veterans, their families, and all of those who died during 9/11 and the wars that followed that fateful day. Along the route, the SEALs stop at the Statue of Liberty and Ellis Island to perform 100 push-ups in honor of America's liberties, and 22 pull-ups in recognition of 22 veterans who commit suicide every day. The event concludes in lower Manhattan to honor the victims of 9/11 and all those who paid the ultimate sacrifice for our country in the wars that followed.”

Awards 
Vetere has received several industry awards, including:
 2021 Tech Inclusion Top 100 CTO/CIOs
 2021 The Most Admired Women Leaders in Business by CIOViews
 2021 Top 20 Businesswomen Leading the Charge of Successful Business by Insight Success
 2020 10 Most Influential Businesswomen to Follow in by Insight Success
 2020 Top 50 Most Powerful Women in Technology by National Diversity Council
 2019 Shortlisted Top Woman of the Year, Women in IT Awards: Silicon Valley
 2019 Top 50 Most Powerful Women in Technology
 2019 Randstad US Human Forward Award
 2018 Global 100 - Top Female C Suite Executive in Technology
 2017 Constellation Business Transformation 150(2017), 
 2017 Excellence in Transforming Business GOLD STEVIE WINNER, (2017)
 Top 10 Women in Cloud by CloudNow (2014)
 Top 100 CIO/CTO Executive Leader in STEM by STEMconnector (2015).

Publications

 "Enterprise Service Management for Dummies", with Bill Sempf 
 "Grit & Grind", March 2019
 "CIO Leadership: Building a Resilient Global Supply Chain Will Drive the Discussion at HMG Strategy’s Philadelphia CIO Summit", August 2021
 "Key Takeaways for CIOs Considering Making Their Next Move", July 15, 2021
 "Boys & Girls Clubs of America 2021"
 "Technology Magazine with IBM"
 "Tech Inclusion Conference: Top 100 CIOS"
 "CIOVIEWS - The Most Admired Women Leader in Business, 2021 VOL III"
 "Insight Success: Top 20 Businesswomen Leading the Charge of Successful Business in 2021"
 "Rhonda Vetere: Thriving in the technology sector, March 2020"
 "Rhonda Vetere: A Gem in the Jewel of Corporate Business"
 "Rhonda Vetere of Herbalife Nutrition: "A Leader Needs To Be An Inspirational Motivator" with Tyler Gallagher & Rhonda Vetere"
 "[Gigabit Magazine] Rhonda Vetere: Excelling in Leadership"
 "High Tech, High Touch: Keeping the Heart in Technology"
 "Gigabit Magazine"
 "National Diversity Council"
 "800-CEO-READ"
 "Tech Exec, Coach and Author Rhonda Vetere"
 "Global 100 - TOP CIOs List"
 "Samsung Podcast: Business Disrupted: IT Innovation Best Practices"
 "Female Disruptors: Rhonda Vetere is changing the face of leadership in business"
 "Female Disruptors: Rhonda Vetere is changing the face of leadership in business"
 "GET YOURSELF THE JOB"
 "WIT Connect 2018"
 "The Goodness of the Soul: Making It Your Business to Share Your Heart"
 "Meet the 2021-2022 School of Business Board of Directors"
 "Interview with Rhonda Vetere"
 "The No. 1 interview question this tech executive asks before hiring a candidate"
 "Interview with Rhonda Vetere, President of nThrive"
 "THREE WOMEN TECHNOLOGY TITANS DISCUSS THE PAST, PRESENT, AND FUTURE AT THE CANADIAN CLOUD COUNCIL’S CONTROL"

References

External links 
 

Year of birth missing (living people)
Living people
American women business executives
Chief technology officers
Estée Lauder Companies people
George Mason University alumni
21st-century American women